Joseph Steward (July 6, 1753, Upton, MA – April 15, 1822, Hartford, CT) was an American minister, portrait painter and museum curator.

Minister

Joseph Steward was born on July 6, 1753, the son of Joseph and Jane (Wilson) Steward of Upton, MA. He attended Dartmouth College, graduating in 1780. Under the guidance of Reverend Doctor Levi Hart of Preston, CT, he continued his divinity studies and was licensed to preach in 1786. However, before long, he became seriously ill and was unable to maintain the parish he had been assigned to in Newport, RI. It is not known for certain what ailment Steward had, but one source suggests it was bronchitis. He remained in Newport for two years while being nursed back to health.
In 1788, he moved to Hampton, CT to fill in for the town's reverend, Samuel Moseley, who had recently become gravely ill. While there, Steward met Sarah Moseley, the reverend's daughter, and they were married on May 31, 1789. They had four children: Sally (Sarah) born in 1790, Joseph (1792), Mariah (1796), and Anna (1799).

Steward continued to fill in for the elder Moseley, but attempts to find him a permanent placement within the parish were prevented by his continuing poor health.

Hartford years
Soon after Mariah's birth, the family moved to Hartford, CT.  In 1797 Steward became a Deacon of the First Church of Hartford, a position he held until his death. In 1799, he joined with Reverends Nathan Strong and Abel Flint to compile a hymnal titled The Hartford Selection of Hymns.  The book was very successful and went through eight editions by 1821.

He died on April 15, 1822 at the age of 69.  He was survived by his wife Sarah and his daughters, Sarah and Anna.  He is buried in the North Cemetery in Hartford, CT (Section F, Lot 452).

Painter

Steward was a largely self-taught artist, although he may have studied with Jonathan Trumbull in the fall of 1792, during Trumbull's brief residency in Hartford. Steward is known to have been painting portraiture on a regular basis by 1788. He did not, however, always paint from life. There are many examples of him copying other works.

In 1793 he was commissioned by Dartmouth College to create full length portraits of John Phillips, a soon-to-be retired member of the college's board, and Eleazar Wheelock, the school's founder.  The portraits were not completed until August 1796.  This was his largest and best documented commission. That same year, he opened a “Painting Room" in the State House.  The Connecticut General Assembly had given him permission to use a room in the newly completed capitol's third floor as a painting studio.

Few of his works appear to be extant or available for public viewing, and many of those are only tentatively identified as his, based on style.

Museum of Natural & Other Curiosities

In June 1797, he opened a museum in his Painting Room. He regularly used newspaper advertising  to solicit donations for the museum, thank contributors, and promote his displays. His collection included portraits, wax works, and other curiosities, man-made as well as natural.  His natural curiosities included a dwarf cow, a two-headed calf and a "sagacious" goat.

By 1808, his collection had outgrown the space available at the Old State House, so he acquired the Talcott Mansion, built in 1725 by Governor Joseph Talcott (1724-1741) and moved his museum there. It was open from 7 a.m. to 9 p.m. “except the evening before and after the sabbath”. The building stood until 1900 when the property was sold by the Moseley family and the building razed.

After Steward's death in 1822 the museum was relocated to 131 State Street, Hartford.  It reopened in the new location on January 6, 1824 and Charles Dickerson became its proprietor. He was succeeded in 1832 by Caleb Wright. The collection remained intact until at least 1840.  Some objects from the museum, including a number of portraits, were donated to the Connecticut Historical Society, which used them to recreate the museum at the Old State House.

References

External links 
 American Folk Art Museum: Early Portraits
 Damned Connecticut:Joseph Steward’s Museum of Natural and Other Curiosities

Bibliography
 French, Henry Willard.  ‘’Art and Artists in Connecticut’’. Boston: Lee & Shepard, Pub. 1879.
 Harlow, Thompson R. “The Life and Trials of Joseph Steward.”  ‘’The Connecticut Historical Society Bulletin’’ 46.4 (1981): 97-164.
 Harlow, Thompson R. “Joseph Steward and the Hartford Museum.” ‘’The Connecticut Historical Society Bulletin’’ 18.1-2 (1953): 2-16.
 Harlow, Thompson R., "The versatile Joseph Steward, portrait painter and museum proprietor." ‘’The Magazine ANTIQUES’’, vol. 121, no. 1 (January 1982), pp. 303-311.
 Walker, George Leon.  ‘’History of the First Church in Hartford’’. Hartford: Brown & Gross, 1884. 368.

1753 births
18th-century American painters
18th-century American male artists
American male painters
19th-century American painters
19th-century American male artists
Dartmouth College alumni
People from Upton, Massachusetts
1822 deaths